Adrian Honkisz (born 27 February 1988) is a Polish racing cyclist, who last rode for Polish amateur team Dar-Bud Team.

Major results

2008
 2nd Road race, National Under-23 Road Championships
 10th Gran Premio Industrie del Marmo
 10th Trofeo Zsšdi
2009
 8th Overall Tour du Maroc
1st Stage 2
2010
 1st  Overall Carpathia Couriers Path
1st Stages 2 & 3
 3rd Tartu GP
 3rd Puchar Ministra Obrony Narodowej
 4th Memoriał Henryka Łasaka
 6th Coupe des Carpathes
 7th Overall Szlakiem Walk Majora Hubala
1st Stage 2
2012
 1st Stage 4 Course de la Solidarité Olympique
 1st  Mountains classification Okolo Slovenska
 8th Overall Tour of Małopolska
2013
 1st Coupe des Carpathes
 2nd Road race, National Road Championships
 7th Overall Tour of Hainan
2014
 1st Stage 3a (TTT) Sibiu Cycling Tour
2015
 1st Coupe des Carpathes
 6th Road race, National Road Championships
 10th GP Polski, Visegrad 4 Bicycle Race
2016
 4th GP Polski, Visegrad 4 Bicycle Race
 7th Korona Kocich Gór
 7th Coupe des Carpathes
2017
 6th Korona Kocich Gór
 7th Szlakiem Wielkich Jezior
2018
 1st  Mountains classification Tour of Małopolska
2019
 5th Race Horizon Park Maidan
 6th Chabany Race

References

External links

1988 births
Living people
Polish male cyclists
Place of birth missing (living people)
20th-century Polish people
21st-century Polish people